Donn Stewart (born 4 November 1993) is a Mexican Actor. He has appeared in: Better Latin Than Never, in different commercials, He lives in Los Angeles, California.

References

1993 births
Living people